DLX may refer to:
 DLX, a RISC processor architecture
 Dancing Links, a computer algorithm
 Warehouse Management System of JDA Software
 Dlx (gene)
 David Letterman Bypass, the proposed name of Interstate 465 in Indianapolis 
 560 in Roman numerals